Sasha Sokolov (born Александр Всеволодович Соколов (Alexander Vsevolodovitch Sokolov) on November 6, 1943, in Ottawa, Ontario, Canada) is a writer of Russian literature.

He became known worldwide in the 1970s after his first novel, A School for Fools, was published in translation by Ardis Publishers (Ann Arbor, Michigan) in the US, and was later reissued by Four Walls Eight Windows. Sokolov is one of the most important authors of 20th-century Russian literature. He is acclaimed for his unorthodox use of language, and for his play with rhythms, sounds and word-associations. The author himself coined the term "proeziia" for his work—in between prose and poetry (English close form of the term can sound as "proetry").

Biography
Sokolov is a Canadian citizen and has lived the larger part of his life in the United States and Canada. During the Second World War, his father, Major Vsevolod Sokolov, worked as a military attaché at the Soviet embassy in Canada. In 1946 Major Sokolov (agent "Davey") was deported from Canada in relation to spying activity. After returning to the Soviet Union in 1946 and growing up there, Sokolov did not fit into the Soviet system. In 1965 he was discarded from a military university, probably because he had tried to flee the country. After that he studied journalism at Moscow State University from 1966 to 1971. Shortly after his first daughter was born in 1974 his first marriage ended.

Sokolov made several attempts to flee the Soviet Union. He was caught while crossing the Iranian border, and only his father's connections helped him to avoid a long imprisonment.

He met his second wife, the Austrian-born Johanna Steindl while she was teaching German at the University in Moscow. She smuggled the text of his first novel into the West. Only after she started a hunger strike in the Stephansdom in Vienna, Austria, in 1975, was Sokolov allowed to leave the Soviet Union. Sokolov left Vienna in late 1976 for the United States after his first novel, A School for Fools had been published. In early 1977, Johanna Steindl gave birth to Sokolov's son, who later became a journalist. He also had a second daughter named Maria Goldfarb, born in New York in 1986, who is an artist. Sokolov later married again several times and is now married to the US rower Marlene Royle.

His second novel, Between Dog and Wolf, depends even more on the particularities of the Russian language, and it was deemed untranslatable for many years. It has therefore enjoyed far less success than A School for Fools, which has been translated into many languages. However, in late 2016, Between Dog and Wolf was translated into English by Alexander Boguslawski, a longtime friend of Mr. Sokolov, and was published by Columbia University Press. Sokolov's 1985 novel Palisandriia was translated as 
Astrophobia and published by Grove Press in the US in 1989. The complete manuscript of his fourth book is said to have been lost when the Greek house where it was written burnt down. Sokolov, who leads a rather reclusive life, says that he keeps writing, but doesn't want to be published any more.

Major works
 Школа для дураков (1976). A School for Fools, trans. Carl R. Proffer (Ardis, 1977); later trans. by Alexander Boguslawski (New York Review Books, 2015)
 Между собакой и волком (1980). Between Dog and Wolf, trans. Alexander Boguslawski (Columbia University Press, 2017)
 Палисандрия [Palisandriia] (1985). Astrophobia, trans. Michael Henry Heim (Grove, 1989)
 In the House of the Hanged: Essays and Vers Libres, trans. Alexander Boguslawski (University of Toronto Press, 2012)

Literature 

D. Barton Johnson: Sasha Sokolov: A Literary Biography, Canadian-American Slavic Studies, 21, Nos 3-4, 1987: 203-230.
Ludmilla L. Litus: Sasha Sokolov's Journey from "Samizdat" to Russia's Favorite Classic: 1976-2006, Canadian-American Slavic Studies, 40, part I, Nos 2-4, 2006: 393-424.
_ with D. Barton Johnson, compilers: Sasha Sokolov: A Selected Annotated Bibliography. 1967-2006, Canadian-American Slavic Studies, 40, part I, Nos 2-4, 2006: 425-94.
Cynthia Simmons: Their father's voice. Vassily Aksyonov, Venedikt Erofeev, Eduard Limonov, and Sasha Sokolov. Lang, New York u.a. 1993,

References

External links and references
Literary Encyclopedia: Sasha Sokolov
Sokolov's page on his Literary Agent's website

1943 births
Living people
American writers of Russian descent
Moscow State University alumni
Postmodern writers
Pushkin Prize winners
Russian male novelists
Russian male short story writers
Soviet male writers
Soviet novelists
Writers from Ottawa
20th-century Russian male writers
20th-century Russian short story writers